Narasingapuram  is a village that belongs to the Kadambathur block of  Tiruvallur district, located about 55 km from Chennai and 21 km from Arakkonam.  The name of this village has been derived from the famous historical Lakshmi Narasimhar Temple is believed to have been built in the 16th century during the Vijayanagara era which is nearly 1500 years ago.  Lakshmi Narasimhar is said to be Varapprasadhi(gives varam(boon) ask for). Woosu Automotive India, a Korean automobile parts production company, is also located in this village.

History
In the early period of Cholas Saivism took prominence and Vaishnavism was suppressed by it.  Even amidst the situation prevailed in south India the temple of Lakhsmi Narasimha enjoyed patronage and was well governed.  Later at the glorious era of Vijayanagara nayaks where Vaishnavism flourished and given much importance in both politics and as a religion, the Lakshmi Narasimhar Temple became important along with sriperumbudur which is a Divya desam.  And the temple is also nearer to sriperumbudur.  Vijayanagara Nayak Emperors patronised it and gave many villages as charter to the temple’s development and as well as the religion.

An old inscription in the Lakshmi Narasimhar Temple which describes about the establishment of the presiding deity’s Urchavar idol Prahaladha Purandhara that is named after the lord’s avathar purport says "Narasinga perumal" temple is situated in the village of Narasa Nayakar Puram that is nearby Coovam (age old chola era saivist temple village) and under the jurisdiction of the Jayamkonda Chola Mandalam of Chandragiri kingdom’s southernmost part. The name of Narasa Nayakar Puram has now become Narasingapuram in the later period because of colloquial reference of the village to the temple and its deity.

Lakshmi Narasimhar normally with an angry exterior but here with a smiling face and is referred to as Shaantha Moorthy. Unlike in other Narasimha Kshetrams, Thaayar is seen directly facing the devotees and blessing them.

Geography
Tiruvallur district is an administrative district in the South Indian state of Tamil Nadu. The town of Thiruvallur is the district headquarters. It is bounded on the north by Andhra Pradesh state, on the east by the Bay of Bengal, on the southeast by Chennai district, on the south by Kanchipuram and on the west by Vellore district. It occupies an area of 3424 km² and has a population of 2,754,756 as of 2001. It is 54.45% urbanised. The district has a literacy of 76.90%, higher than the state average.

See also 
Lakshmi Narasimhar Temple, Narasinghapuram

References

Villages in Tiruvallur district